was a waka poet in the early Heian period. There is a possibility that there never was such a person. Some believe him to have been Prince Yamashiro no Ōe.

Poetry example 
The following waka is attributed to him, a classic :

This poem is the 215th poem of the Kokin Wakashū, and was also incorporate into Fujiwara no Teika's famous Ogura Hyakunin Isshu, as number 5.

References

Further reading 
Papinot, Edmond (1910). Historical and geographical dictionary of Japan. Tokyo: Librarie Sansaisha.

Japanese poets
People of Heian-period Japan
Hyakunin Isshu poets
Deified Japanese people